Jorge Gárate (1917–1990) was an Argentine film editor.

Selected filmography
 At the Sound of the Bugle (1941)
 Girls Orchestra (1941)
 The Third Kiss (1942)
 Carmen (1943)
 Saint Candida (1945)
 The Songstress (1946)
 Cristina (1946)
 The Headless Woman (1947)
 Christmas with the Poor (1947)
 Passport to Rio (1948)
 God Reward You (1948)
 The Tango Returns to Paris (1948)
 Story of a Bad Woman (1948)
 The Unwanted (1951)
 The Black Vampire (1953)
 The Count of Monte Cristo (1953)
 The Age of Love (1954)
 The Grandfather (1954)
 Alejandra (1956)
 The House of the Angel (1957)
 The Kidnapper  (1958)
 Behind a Long Wall (1958)
 Thirst (1960)
 The Terrorist (1962)
 The Last Floor (1962)
 Cleopatra Was Candida (1964)
 Arm in Arm Down the Street (1966)
 Traitors of San Angel (1967)
 Había una vez un circo (1972)
 My Family's Beautiful! (1980)

References

Bibliography 
 Peter Cowie & Derek Elley. World Filmography: 1967. Fairleigh Dickinson University Press, 1977.

External links 
 

1917 births
1990 deaths
Argentine film editors
People from Buenos Aires